De Bruijn is a Dutch surname meaning "the brown". Notable people with the surname include:

  (1887–1968), Dutch politician
 Brian de Bruijn (b. 1954), Dutch-Canadian ice hockey player
 Chantal de Bruijn (b. 1976), Dutch field hockey defender
 Cornelis de Bruijn (1652–1726/7), Dutch artist and traveler
 Daniëlle de Bruijn (b. 1978), Dutch water polo player
 Frans de Bruijn Kops (1886–1979), Dutch footballer
 Hans de Bruijn (b. 1962), Dutch political scientist
 Inge de Bruijn (b. 1973), Dutch swimmer
  (born 1965), Dutch billiards player
 Jean Victor de Bruijn (1913–1979), Dutch district officer and ethnologist in the Dutch East Indies
 Maarten de Bruijn (b. 1965), Dutch engineer
 Maria Brigitta Catherina de Bruijn (1938–2006), Dutch GreenLeft politician
 Matthijs de Bruijn (b. 1977), Dutch waterpolo player
 Meike de Bruijn (born 1970), Dutch racing cyclist
 Nick de Bruijn (b. 1987), Dutch racing driver
 Nicolaas Govert de Bruijn (1918–2012), Dutch mathematician
 Pi de Bruijn (b. 1942), Dutch architect
 Sophia Adriana de Bruijn (1816–1890), Dutch museum founder
 Ruben Jacob de Bruijn (b. 2003), Dutch clothing designer

Mathematics
In mathematics, de Bruijn may refer to one of the following topics named after Nicolaas Govert de Bruijn:
 De Bruijn sequence, a cyclic sequence of a given alphabet such that every length n subsequence appears exactly once
 De Bruijn torus, a generalization of the De Bruijn sequence in two dimensions
 De Bruijn graph, a graph representing overlaps between sequences of symbols
 De Bruijn–Erdős theorem (disambiguation)
 De Bruijn–Erdős theorem (graph theory), a theorem about graph coloring
 De Bruijn–Erdős theorem (incidence geometry), a theorem about lines determined by points in the projective plane
 De Bruijn index, a nameless representation of the λ calculus
 De Bruijn–Newman constant, Λ, a mathematical constant related to the Riemann zeta-function
 De Bruijn notation, a syntax for terms in the λ calculus
 De Bruijn's theorem, a theorem regarding the packing of bricks into boxes

See also
Bruijn
De Bruyn
De Bruin
De Bruyne

Dutch-language surnames